Bolma anacanthos is an extinct species of sea snail, a marine gastropod mollusk, in the family Turbinidae, the turban snails.

Distribution
This species occurs in Victoria (Australian state).

References

Turbinidae